Grassy Park is a suburb of the City of Cape Town in the Western Cape Province of South Africa.

It  is bordered to the east by the suburb of Lotus River, to the north by the suburb of Parkwood and to the west by a small lake called Princess Vlei. To the south lies Rondevlei and Zeekoevlei. The Rondevlei Nature Reserve is home to a very shy hippopotamus, a few eland and other mostly nocturnal animals including many caracal and porcupine. Rondevlei is also home to a healthy pelican community. Zeekoevlei is one of the many freshwater lakes in the district.

History 
Grassy Park began to develop in the early 1900s on part of the Montagu's Gift estate north of Zeekoevlei. At that time, the area was rural, under the administration of the Divisional Council of the Cape. By 1920, the estate had 2000 residents.  From 1923, it was represented on the Southern Civic Association.

Grassy Park was proclaimed a local area in 1935, which meant that the residents received municipal services, for which they paid higher rates.  It was later incorporated into the South Peninsula Municipality in 1996, and into the City of Cape Town in 2000.

Education 
Grassy park is home to four Primary schools and two Secondary schools:

 Grassy Park E.C. Primary School
 Fairview Primary School
 Kannemeyer Primary School
 Sid G. Rule Primary
 Grassy Park High School
 Grassdale High School.

Religion 
There are several places of worship in Grassy Park. These include:

 Acts Mission Church of SA
 Assembly Of God
 Calvyn Protestant Church Grassy Park
 Gereformeerde Kerk - Grassy Park
 Grassy Park Methodist Church
 Grassy Park Moravian Church
 Masjid Ahmediyah (Grassy Park Mosque)
 Grassy Park Seventh-day Adventist Church
 Church Of The Good Shepherd
 New Apostolic Church Grassy Park
 New Apostolic Church Grassy Park Central
 New Apostolic Church Grassy Park West
Old Apostolic Church
 Our Lady Queen of Peace Catholic Church
 Trinity African Methodist Episcopal Church Grassy Park

Sports and recreation 
The Rooikrans Sports Ground in Grassy Park has playing fields for a variety of sports such as baseball, cricket, rugby and soccer.  There are several sports teams based here. These include Grassy Park Crusaders Baseball Club, Grassy Park United Football Club, Titans RFC (Rugby-Football Club). The Grassy Park Chess Academy is a chess club based in Grassy Park.

Commercial areas and community facilities 

Grassy Park's main commercial area is an intersection called "Busy Corner" at the intersection of 5th Avenue and Victoria Road. There is a hub of small retail outlets, the local Library, Police Station and a transport interchange which connects Grassy Park to Mitchell's Plain, Retreat and Wynberg. Another commercial area is at the corner of Prince George Drive and 5th Avenue where supermarkets, fast food restaurants and a petrol station can be found. Various small shops and businesses can also be found along Lake Road.

Grassy Park is also home to the Cape of Good Hope SPCA and LOFOB. Other public amenities in Grassy Park include the Grassy Park Community Health Clinic, Grassy Park Civic Centre and Battswood Art Centre.

References

Suburbs of Cape Town